Lepturus (common name thintail) is a genus of plants in the grass family, native to Asia, Africa, Australia, and various islands in the Indian and Pacific Oceans.

 Species
 Lepturus anadabolavensis A.Camus - Madagascar
 Lepturus androyensis A.Camus - Madagascar
 Lepturus boinensis A.Camus - Madagascar
 Lepturus calcareus Cope - Socotra
 Lepturus copeanus B.K.Simon - Australia
 Lepturus geminatus C.E.Hubb. - Australia
 Lepturus humbertianus A.Camus - Madagascar
 Lepturus minutus B.K.Simon - Queensland
 Lepturus nesiotes Cope - Socotra
 Lepturus perrieri A.Camus - Madagascar
 Lepturus pulchellus (Balf.f.) Clayton  - Socotra
 Lepturus radicans (Steud.) A.Camus - Kenya, Tanzania, Malawi, Mozambique, Zimbabwe, Madagascar, Comoros, Mauritius, Seychelles, India
 Lepturus repens (J.R.Forst.) R.Br. - Somalia, Kenya, Tanzania, Mozambique, KwaZulu-Natal, Madagascar, Chagos Is, Mauritius, Rodrigues I, Aldabra, Lakshadweep, Sri Lanka, Andaman Is, Paracel Is, Thailand, Vietnam, Taiwan, Japan, Cocos Is, Malaysia, Indonesia, Philippines, Christmas I, New Guinea, Solomon Is, Australia (including on Bramble Cay in the Torres Strait), many of the Pacific Islands
 Lepturus tenuis Balf.f. - Socotra
 Lepturus xerophilus Domin - Australia

 formerly included
numerous species now considered better suited in other genera: Hemarthria Henrardia Hainardia Oropetium Parapholis Scribneria

References

 
Poaceae genera
Taxonomy articles created by Polbot